Ido Exbard (born on 16 December 1988) is an Israeli footballer currently playing for Maccabi Herzliya as a forward.

Career
Exbard began his career in the youth department of Maccabi Tel Aviv. At age of 14 he moved to the youth department of Beitar Shimshon Tel Aviv where he advanced to the senior team. In the 2007–08 season he played in Israel State Cup semi-finals while Beitar Shimshon Tel Aviv was in the third division. In the summer of 2008 he was supposed to leave the team, but problems in obtaining the release from Beitar Shimshon left him playing for them for another two seasons. In the 2009–10 season he scored 13 goals in Second Division for Beitar Shimshon.

After lengthy negotiations and intervention of the Players Status Committee, Exbard moved in the 2010–11 season to Hapoel Petah Tikva.

In the 2011–12 season, Exbard signed a four years contract with Hapoel Be'er Sheva.

In the 2013–14 season, Exbard moved to Maccabi Netanya. The next season Ido moved to play for Maccabi Ahi Nazareth which proved to be his finest season yet as he scored 21 league goals and 5 goals in the State Cup.

Honours
Liga Leumit
2013–14

Personal life
Ido has two brothers who play professional Basketball, older brother Tomer who played in the past for Hapoel Tel Aviv and now plays for AS Ramat HaSharon in the Liga Leumit with his younger brother Ofir.

References

1988 births
Living people
Israeli footballers
Footballers from Tel Aviv
Maccabi Tel Aviv F.C. players
Beitar Tel Aviv Bat Yam F.C. players
Hapoel Petah Tikva F.C. players
Hapoel Be'er Sheva F.C. players
Maccabi Netanya F.C. players
Maccabi Ahi Nazareth F.C. players
Hapoel Ironi Kiryat Shmona F.C. players
Hapoel Acre F.C. players
Hapoel Tel Aviv F.C. players
Sektzia Ness Ziona F.C. players
Hapoel Marmorek F.C. players
Shimshon Kafr Qasim F.C. players
Maccabi Herzliya F.C. players
Liga Leumit players
Israeli Premier League players
Israeli people of Argentine-Jewish descent
Sportspeople of Argentine descent
Association football forwards